Ali Gunyar (born 22 September 1979 in Eindhoven) is a Turkish-Dutch middleweight Muay Thai kickboxer fighting out of Eindhoven, Netherlands for Team Gunyar, where he is trained by his brother Suleyman Gunyar.  Ali is a four-time kickboxing and Muay Thai world champion, who has made appearances for the K-1 MAX, SuperLeague and It's Showtime organizations.  As of 2011 Ali is the current W.I.P.U. "King of the Ring" super middleweight world champion in K-1 rules

Biography and career

Growing up in his home town of Eindhoven, Ali started training in Kyokushin karate at the age of five with his older brother (and now trainer) Suleyman, taking up also Thai-boxing at the age of eight.  As well as studying martial arts, the young Ali played youth football for PSV Eindhoven but would be unable to gain a pro-contract so re-focused on kickboxing.  At the age of thirteen he took the Dutch youth title in 1992, along with friend and fellow gym member Yücel Fidan and would accumulate an impressive record of 47 wins with just one defeat at B-Klass and C-Klass level.

In 1996, aged seventeen, Ali made his A-Klass debut.  He would go on to win his first major title the very year, defeating Oliver Winter to win the I.S.K.A. European title before winning the I.K.B.O. European title the following year.  Between 1999 and 2002 Ali would win more honors, a Dutch national title (W.P.K.L) and two world titles; the I.M.T.F. against Mohamed Mustati and World Full Contact Association (W.F.C.A.) against Baker Barakat.  He also became a trainer in 2000 at the Al-Fid Gym along with his brother Suleyman and Yücel Fidan, helping to teach young fighters as well as fight himself.

Ali made his K-1 MAX debut in 2006 when he was invited to take part in an elimination fight at the K-1 World MAX Open.  He was denied his dream of a quarter final place at the final in Tokyo, losing by decision to first time K-1 MAX champion Albert Kraus.  The very same year he also made his debut with (the now defunct) SuperLeague organization at their eight man middleweight tournament, held in Ali's homeland of Turkey.  Ali did well in his quarter final match beating the experienced Muay Thai specialist Ole Laursen in the quarter finals before losing to the organization's top fighter, Alviar Lima, by technical knockout due to a hand injury that left Ali unable to continue.  Sandwiched between his appearances for two of kickboxing's top organizations, was a win against Jose Barradas to claim the Muay Thai version of the W.F.C.A. world title in his hometown of Eindhoven.

Since the end of 2006, Ali has had a number of fights in the Netherlands and abroad, winning the relatively unheard of. O.P.B.U. Europe-African title against the tough Moroccan pitbull Chahid Oulad El Hadj but losing title fights against Farid Villaume, Albert Kraus (rematch) and most recently against Mike Zambidis.  He also made a brief return to K-1 MAX, losing to Leroy Kaestner in a failed bid at qualification for the final 16 stage of the 2009 K-1 World MAX final.  In 2011 Ali won his fourth world title - winning the W.I.P.U. "King of the Ring" super middleweight belt beating former SuperLeague fighter Fadi Merza at the A-1 Combat World Cup in Eindhoven.

He defeated Grega Smole via unanimous decision at Enfusion Live 5 in Eindhoven, Netherlands on 11 May 2013 and became first Enfusion Live -75 kg World Champion. He lost the title at Enfusion Live 11 in London on 1 December 2013 to Michael Wakeling. In the third round Wakeling threw a spinning back fist and caught Ali on the jaw with his forearm, which caused Ali to refuse to fight anymore. Judges scored the fight with unanimous decision for Wakeling.

Titles
2013 Enfusion Live -75 kg World Title
2011 W.I.P.U. "King of the Ring" K-1 Rules Super Middleweight world champion -75 kg
2008 O.P.B.U. K-1 Rules Euro-African champion -72.5 kg
2006 W.F.C.A. Muay Thai world champion -72.5 kg
2002 W.F.C.A. Full-Contact world champion -76.2 kg
2002 I.T.M.F. Muay Thai world champion -72.5 kg
1999 W.P.K.L. Muay Thai Dutch champion -79 kg
1998 I.K.B.O. Muay Thai European champion -76.2 kg
1997 I.S.K.A. Full-Contact European champion -79 kg

Kickboxing record 

|-
|-  bgcolor="#FFBBBB"
| 2013-12-01 || Loss ||align=left| Michael Wakeling || Enfusion Live 11 || London, England || Decision (Unanimous) || 3 ||  
|-
! style=background:white colspan=9 |
|- 
|-  bgcolor="#CCFFCC"
| 2013-05-11 || Win ||align=left| Grega Smole || Enfusion Live 5 || Eindhoven, Netherlands || Decision || 3 || 3:00
|-
! style=background:white colspan=9 |
|- 
|-  bgcolor="#FFBBBB"
| 2011-09-02 || Loss ||align=left| Marco Piqué || Muay Thai Premier League: Round 3 || The Hague, Netherlands || Decision (Unanimous) || 5 || 3:00
|-  bgcolor="#CCFFCC"
| 2011-04-09 || Win ||align=left| Fadi Merza || A1 World Combat Cup, Indoor Sportcentrum || Eindhoven, Netherlands || Decision (Unanimous) || 3 || 3:00
|-
! style=background:white colspan=9 |
|-
|-  bgcolor="#FFBBBB"
| 2011-03-12 || Loss ||align=left| Mike Zambidis || Iron Challenge || Athens, Greece || Decision (Unanimous) || 5 || 3:00 
|-
! style=background:white colspan=9 |
|-
|-  bgcolor="#CCFFCC"
| 2010-06-19 || Win ||align=left| Jan van Denderen || A-1 World Combat Cup || Eindhoven, Netherlands || Decision || 3 || 3:00 
|-
|-  bgcolor="#FFBBBB"
| 2010-05-02 || Loss ||align=left| Khalid Bourdif || Next Generation Warriors 4 || Utrecht, Netherlands || Decision || 5 || 3:00  
|-
|-  bgcolor="#FFBBBB"
| 2010-02-27 || Loss ||align=left| L'houcine Ouzgni || Fight Club Amsterdam III || Amsterdam, Netherlands || KO (Right Cross) || 2 || 
|-
|-  bgcolor="#CCFFCC"
| 2009-11-20 || Win ||align=left| Virgil Kalakoda || War of the Worlds || Melbourne, Australia || Decision (Unanimous) || 3 || 3:00 
|-
|-  bgcolor="#CCFFCC"
| 2009-10-17 || Win ||align=left| Halim Issaoui || Ultimate Glory 11 || Amsterdam, Netherlands || Decision || 3 || 3:00 
|-
|-  bgcolor="#CCFFCC"
| 2009-06-13 || Win ||align=left| Tarik Slimani || Gentleman Fight Night Part 6 || Tilburg, Netherlands || KO || 1 ||  
|-
|-  bgcolor="#FFBBBB"
| 2009-05-16 || Loss ||align=left| Farid Villaume || Légendes et Guerriers || Toulouse, France || Forfeit || ||  
|-
! style=background:white colspan=9 |
|-
|-  bgcolor="#FFBBBB"
| 2009-03-01 || Loss ||align=left| Leroy Kaestner || K-1 World MAX 2009 Europe, Quarter Finals || Utrecht, Netherlands || Decision (Unanimous) || 3 || 3:00 
|-
|-  bgcolor="#CCFFCC"
| 2008-12-20 || Win ||align=left| Lamsongkram Chuwattana || Boxe-Thai Guinea tournament, Quarter Finals || Malabo, Equatorial Guinea || Disq. (Elbow) || || 
|-
! style=background:white colspan=9 |
|-
|-  bgcolor="#CCFFCC"
| 2008-10-31 || Win ||align=left| Mark Vogel || Wuppertal Gentleman Fight Night || Wuppertal, Germany || Decision || 3 || 3:00 
|-
|-  bgcolor="#CCFFCC"
| 2008-10-05 || Win ||align=left| Chahid Oulad El Hadj || Tough is not Enough || Rotterdam, Netherlands || Decision (Unanimous) || 3 || 3:00 
|-
! style=background:white colspan=9 |
|-
|-  bgcolor="#FFBBBB"
| 2008-05-24 || Loss ||align=left| Albert Kraus || Gentleman Promotions Fightnight || Tilburg, Netherlands || KO (Knee Strike) || 2 ||   
|-
! style=background:white colspan=9 |
|-
|-  bgcolor="#CCFFCC"
| 2008-03-24 || Win ||align=left| William Diender || Born2Fight || Westervoort, Netherlands || Decision || 5 || 3:00 
|-
|-  bgcolor="#CCFFCC"
| 2008-03-02 || Win ||align=left| Farid Villaume || SLAMM "Nederland vs Thailand IV" || Almere, Netherlands || Decision || 5 || 3:00  
|-
|-  bgcolor="#CCFFCC"
| 2007-12-? || Win ||align=left| Rachid Kabbouri || A1 Combat Cup || Mersin, Turkey || Ext.R Decision (Unanimous) || 4 || 3:00
|-
|-  bgcolor="#c5d2ea"
| 2007-11-24 || NC ||align=left| Faldir Chahbari || Shootboxing in the Autotron || Rosmalen, Netherlands || No Contest || 3 || 3:00
|-
|-  bgcolor="#FFBBBB"
| 2007-05-04 || Loss ||align=left| Marco Piqué || Steko's Fight Night 24, Final || Pforzheim, Germany || Decision (Unanimous) || 3 || 3:00
|-
! style=background:white colspan=9 |
|-
|-  bgcolor="#CCFFCC"
| 2007-04-05 || Win ||align=left| Yohan Lidon || Steko's Fight Night 24, Semi Finals || Pforzheim, Germany || Decision (Split) || 3 || 3:00
|-
|-  bgcolor="#FFBBBB"
| 2006-11-12 || Loss ||align=left| Faldir Chahbari || 2H2H: Pride & Honor || Rotterdam, Netherlands || Decision (Unanimous) || 5 || 3:00
|-
|-  bgcolor="#FFBBBB"
| 2006-09-24 || Loss ||align=left| Alviar Lima || SuperLeague Turkey 2005, Semi Finals || Istanbul, Turkey || TKO (Corner Stop) || 2 || 
|-
|-  bgcolor="#CCFFCC"
| 2006-09-24 || Win ||align=left| Ole Laursen || SuperLeague Turkey 2005, Quarter Finals || Istanbul, Turkey || Decision || 3 || 3:00 
|-
|-  bgcolor="#cfc"
| 2006-04-28 || Win||align=left| Akeomi Nitta|| SNKA TITANS 3rd || Tokyo, Japan || Decision (Majority) || 5 || 3:00
|-  bgcolor="#CCFFCC"
| 2006-04-15 || Win ||align=left| Jose Barradas || Pro Kickboxing Europe || Eindhoven, Netherlands || Decision || 5 || 3:00 
|-
! style=background:white colspan=9 |
|-
|-  bgcolor="#FFBBBB"
| 2006-04-05 || Loss ||align=left| Albert Kraus || K-1 World MAX 2006 Open || Tokyo, Japan || Decision (Unanimous) || 3 || 3:00 
|-
! style=background:white colspan=9 |
|-
|-  bgcolor="#FFBBBB"
| 2005-06-12 || Loss ||align=left| Şahin Yakut || It's Showtime 2005 Amsterdam || Amsterdam, Netherlands || TKO (Corner Stop/Low Kicks) || 4 ||  
|-
|-  bgcolor="#CCFFCC"
| 2005-04-30 || Win ||align=left| Jamal Danache || Queens Fight Night Eindhoven || Eindhoven, Netherlands || TKO || 2 || 
|-
|-  bgcolor="#FFBBBB"
| 2005-03-19 || Loss ||align=left| Gago Drago || Gentleman's Promotion Gala || Tilburg, Netherlands || TKO (Doc Stop) || 2 ||  
|-
|-  bgcolor="#CCFFCC"
| 2004-10-17 || Win ||align=left| Benito Caupain || Battle of Zaandam || Zaandam, Netherlands || Decision || 3 || 3:00 
|-
|-  bgcolor="#FFBBBB"
| 2004-01-25 || Loss ||align=left| Gago Drago || Thaiboxing & Freefight event in Alkmaar || Alkmaar, Netherlands || TKO || 2 ||  
|-
|-  bgcolor="#FFBBBB"
| 2004-04-18 || Loss ||align=left| Youness El Mhassani || BIG BANG || Elst, Netherlands || Ext.R Decision || 4 || 3:00  
|-
|-  bgcolor="#CCFFCC"
| 2003-11-30 || Win ||align=left| Marco Piqué || Killerdome V || Amsterdam, Netherlands || Decision || 5 || 3:00
|-
|-  bgcolor="#c5d2ea"
| 2003-06-08 || Draw ||align=left| Denis Sharoykin || It's Showtime 2003 Amsterdam || Amsterdam, Netherlands || Decision Draw || 5 || 3:00
|-
|-  bgcolor="#FFBBBB"
| 2003-04-12 || Loss ||align=left| Chris van Venrooij || Magic Duo Part 3 Eindhoven || Eindhoven, Netherlands || Decision || 5 || 3:00  
|-
|-  bgcolor="#FFBBBB"
| 2002-11-30 || Loss ||align=left| Vincent Vielvoye || Gala in Rotterdam || Rotterdam, Netherlands || TKO (Corner Stop) || 2 || 
|-
|-  bgcolor="#CCFFCC"
| 2002-06-? || Win ||align=left| Baker Barakat || || || || || 
|-
! style=background:white colspan=9 |
|-
|-  bgcolor="#CCFFCC"
| 2002-04-27 || Win ||align=left| Mohamed Mustati || Eindhoven Al-Fid Gym Gala || Eindhoven, Netherlands || Decision || 5 || 3:00 
|-
! style=background:white colspan=9 |
|-
|-  bgcolor="#FFBBBB"
| 2001-10-21 || Loss ||align=left| Şahin Yakut || It's Showtime - Original || Haarlem, Netherlands || TKO || 3 ||  
|-
|-  bgcolor="#CCFFCC"
| 1999-04-? || Win ||align=left| Silvio Zimmerman || || Netherlands || || || 
|-
! style=background:white colspan=9 |
|-
|-  bgcolor="#CCFFCC"
| 1998-05-? || Win ||align=left| Thomas Hladky || || || || || 
|-
! style=background:white colspan=9 |
|-
|-  bgcolor="#CCFFCC"
| 1997-11-? || Win ||align=left| Oliver Winter || || || || || 
|-
! style=background:white colspan=9 |
|-
|-
| colspan=9 | Legend:

References

External links
Official Website of Ali Gunyar (Dutch Language)

1979 births
Living people
Dutch male kickboxers
Turkish male kickboxers
Middleweight kickboxers
Dutch Muay Thai practitioners
Turkish Muay Thai practitioners
Kickboxing trainers
Kyokushin kaikan practitioners
Sportspeople from Eindhoven
Dutch people of Turkish descent
Dutch male karateka